Nibe Municipality ceased to exit on January 1, 2007 due to Kommunalreformen ("The Municipality Reform" of 2007).  It was merged with Hals Municipality, Sejlflod Municipality and Aalborg Municipality to form the new Aalborg Municipality.

The former municipality covered an area of 185 km², and had a total population of 8,283 (2005). Its last mayor was Jens Østergaard Madsen, a member of the Venstre (Liberal Party) political party.

Former municipalities of Denmark
Aalborg Municipality